Time Warrior or Time Warriors may refer to:

The Time Warrior, a 1973 Doctor Who serial
Josh Kirby... Time Warrior!, a series of science fiction films released between 1995 and 1996
Warrior on the Edge of Time, a 1975 album by Hawkwind
Good Time Warrior, a 1978 album by Lucifer's Friend
Time Warriors (video game)
Time Warrior, a 2012 independent science fiction film.